This is a list of events from the year 1538 in Ireland.

Incumbent
Lord: Henry VIII

Events
 Dissolution of the Monasteries: the following establishments are among those suppressed:
 Timolin Priory (held by Edmund Eustas from 14 January).
 Ferns Abbey (abbot and canons leave 31 March).
 Navan Abbey (surrendered 19 July).
 Priory of All Hallows, Dublin.
 July 11 – Galway is visited by Lord Deputy of Ireland, Leonard Grey. This is the first visit of a King's Deputy to the town, and marks the start of closer relations between the sometimes-beleaguered town and the Anglo-Irish administration in Dublin. He is lavishly entertained and stays for seven days.
 December – the Franciscan Friary at Cashel is rented to Edmund Butler, Archbishop of Cashel.
 Newry Abbey becomes a secular collegiate church.
 Church of Ireland Kilkenny College is founded as Kilkenny Grammar School by Piers Butler, 8th Earl of Ormond, and his wife, Margaret, to replace the School of the Vicars Choral.
 Ulick na gCeann Burke deposes his uncle Richard Bacach Burke as The Clanricarde and Chief of the Name.

Births

Deaths
 Richard Bacach Burke, the Clanricarde and Chief of the Name.

References

 
1530s in Ireland
Ireland
Years of the 16th century in Ireland